Shunta Todd (born 31 July 1988) is a Bermudian woman cricketer. She played for Bermuda at the 2008 Women's Cricket World Cup Qualifier.

References

External links 

1988 births
Living people
Bermudian women cricketers